

General

Flag of Kyrgyzstan - Kyrgyz - Kyrgyzstan - Outline of Kyrgyzstan

Geography

Aksy - Balykchy - Chatyr-Kul -  Chuy Valley - Climate of Kyrgyzstan - Environmental issues in Kyrgyzstan - Fergana Valley - Issyk-Kul Lake - Kara-Suu District - List of birds of Kyrgyzstan - List of mammals of Kyrgyzstan - Peak Jengish Chokusu- Provinces of Kyrgyzstan - Raions of Kyrgyzstan - Songköl Too - Sulayman Mountain - Tian-Shan

Populated places 

Aksy - Bishkek- Batken - Chuy - Jalal-Abad - List of villages in Kyrgyzstan - Naryn - Osh - Talas

Regions 
Batken Region - Chuy Region - Issyk Kul Region - Jalal-Abad Region - Naryn Region - Osh Region- Talas Region

Rivers

Ala-Archa River - Alabuga River - At-Bashi River - Chatkal River - Chong-Kemin River - Chu River - Kara Darya - Kara-Suu - Kegart River - Kichi-Kemin River
- Kurshab River - Naryn River - Sokh River - Talas River - Tar River (Kyrgyzstan) - Toshkan River - Vakhsh River - Ysyk-Ata River

Valleys

Alay Valley- Arpa Valley - Chuy Valley - Fergana Valley - Kichi-Kemin Valley

History 

Yenisei Kyrgyz- Saka - Turkic Kaganate - Uighur Kaganate - 
Turkic expansion - Mongol invasion of Central Asia - Oirats - Qing Dynasty - Khanate of Kokand - Kara-Kyrgyz Autonomous Oblast - Kirghiz rebellion - Battle of Kashgar (1933) - Battle of Kashgar (1934) - Kirghiz Soviet Socialist Republic - Democratic Movement of Kyrgyzstan - Commonwealth of Independent States - Osh riots (1990) - Tulip Revolution - 2010 Kyrgyzstan crisis - 2010 Kyrgyzstani uprising - 2010 South Kyrgyzstan riots

Demographics and language 

Demographics of Kyrgyzstan - Kyrgyz language - Kyrgyz alphabet - Old Turkic script - Romanization of Kyrgyz - Turkic peoples

Religion

Buddhism in Kyrgyzstan - Christianity in Kyrgyzstan - Islam in Kyrgyzstan - 
Roman Catholicism in Kyrgyzstan - Jews in Kyrgyzstan

Culture

Bride kidnapping - Cuisine of Kyrgyzstan - Foundation for Tolerance International - Komuz - Kyrgyz music - Kyz Kuumai - LGBT rights in Kyrgyzstan (Gay rights) - List of World Heritage Sites in Kyrgyzstan - Epic of Manas - Saimaluu Tash - Tush kyiz - Where the Sky Meets the Land

Universities
American University of Central Asia - International Atatürk-Alatoo University -International University Of Kyrgyzstan - Kyrgyz National University -  Kyrgyz Technical University - Osh State University - Osh State University

Politics and diplomacy

Collective Security Treaty Organisation - Diplomatic missions in Kyrgyzstan - Diplomatic missions of Kyrgyzstan
Egemen - Elections in Kyrgyzstan - Kyrgyzstan–Russia relations
List of political parties in Kyrgyzstan - People's Movement of Kyrgyzstan

Notable people
Valentina Shevchenko - Abdylas Maldybaev - Almazbek Atambayev - Askar Akayev - Bermet Akayeva- Chinghiz Aitmatov  - Nazira Aytbekova - Daniyar Usenov - Felix Kulov - Kasym Tynystanov -  Kurmanbek Bakiyev - Kurmanjan Datka - Omurbek Tekebayev - Orzubek Nazarov - Nasirdin Isanov  - Roza Otunbayeva - Zamira Sydykova

Economy

Agriculture in Kyrgyzstan- Banking in Kyrgyzstan - Kumtor Gold Mine - Manas International Airport -  Osh Airport - Transport in Kyrgyzstan

Protected areas 

Ak-Suu Complex Nature Reserve - Ala Archa National Park - Besh-Aral State Nature Reserve - Chandalash Wildlife Refuge - Chatyrkul Wildlife Refuge - Karatal-Japyryk State Nature Reserve - Sary-Chelek Nature Reserve - State Nature National Park Besh-Tash -  Surmatash Nature Reserve

Military

Kant Air Base - Manas Air Base

Sports
Football Federation of Kyrgyz Republic - Kanatbek Begaliev - Kyrgyzstan men's national ice hockey team - Kyrgyzstan national football team -  Ruslan Tyumenbayev 

Kyrgyzstan